Sables-d'Or-les-Pins is a French Seaside resort, located mainly in Fréhel commune in the Côtes-d'Armor department in Brittany in northwestern France.

It was created  in 1921 and is known for its long beach located along a spit and its dunes.

Roland Brouard, the initiator of the project, intended to create a competitor to resorts like Deauville and La Baule.

In 1929, as a consequence of the Great Depression, the development of the resort stopped.

After World War II, Sables d'Or became a quiet family beach.

Facilities
 Harbour (used by a quarry)
 Casino
 Golf Course
 Sailing school and club
 Roman Catholic Chapel

See also
Fréhel

Resorts in France
Seaside resorts in France